The Collins Library is an imprint of McSweeney's Books that publishes unusual out-of-print books.  The imprint is named for its editor, Paul Collins.

Publications
 English as She Is Spoke, by José da Fonseca and Pedro Carolino (1855) (McSweeney's, 2002) 
 To Ruhleben—And Back, by Geoffrey Pike (1916) (McSweeney's, 2003) 
 Lady into Fox, by David Garnett (1922) (McSweeney's, 2004) 
 The Riddle of the Traveling Skull, by Harry Stephen Keeler (1934) (McSweeney's, 2005) 
 The Lunatic at Large, by J. Storer Clouston (1899) (McSweeney's, 2007) 
 Curious Men, by Frank Buckland (McSweeney's, 2008) 
 The Rector and the Rogue, by W.A. Swanberg (1969) (McSweeney's, 2011) 

McSweeney's